Greg Evans may refer to:

 Greg Evans (American football) (born 1971), professional American football player
 Greg Evans (cartoonist) (born 1947), American cartoonist
 Greg Evans (One Life to Live), a fictional character on the American soap opera One Life to Live
 Greg Evans (RAAF officer) (born 1957), Air Vice Marshal, former Deputy Chief of Joint Operations (Australia)
 Greg Evans (television host) (born 1953), Australian television host
 Gregory Evans (1913–2010), Canadian judge
 Gregory Evans (dramatist), British radio and television playwright